Moradabad (also Romanized as Morādābād; also known as Murādābād) is a village in Miyan Rud Rural District, Qolqol Rud District, Tuyserkan County, Hamadan Province, Iran. At the 2006 census, its population was 627, in 137 families.

References 

Populated places in Tuyserkan County